Danilo Bacchi (born 8 February 1983, in Rome) is an Italian association football defender who currently plays for Celano F.C. Olimpia.

Caps on Italian Series 

Serie C1 : 24 Caps, 1 Goal

Serie C2 : 85 Caps

Total : 109 Caps, 1 Goal

External links
 

Living people
1983 births
Italian footballers
U.S. Viterbese 1908 players
Association football defenders